Aledo is a city in Parker County, Texas, United States. The population was 4,858 in 2020.

The city is served by the Aledo Independent School District.

History 
The Parker post office was established in 1880 by Littleberry Rudolph Fawks. Two years later the name was changed to Aledo, likely suggested by a Texas & Pacific Railway official for Aledo, Illinois.  Post office established May 25, 1882 as Aledo, postmaster Eli J. McConnell.

Geography

Climate

Demographics

As of the 2020 United States census, there were 4,858 people, 1,564 households, and 1,219 families residing in the city.

Notable people

 David Barton, founder and president of the Wallbuilders organization.
 E. R. Bills, a writer and journalist known for his books on Texas history and his research into the Slocum Massacre
 Daniel Hunter, known for his music project, Analog Rebellion
 Mary Michael Patterson, Broadway actress and singer
 Bill Paxton, actor and director, lived in Aledo before moving to Fort Worth, Texas
 Sloan Struble, known for his indie pop project Dayglow

References

External links
 City of Aledo
 Aledo Independent School District
 Handbook of Texas Online

Dallas–Fort Worth metroplex
Cities in Texas
Cities in Parker County, Texas